"Lonely Street" is a 1956 song written by Carl Belew, Kenny Sowder, and W.S. Stevenson, originally performed by Belew, and later by Dave Rich. Its most successful rendition was by Andy Williams, whose version reached #5 on the Billboard chart and #20 on the R&B chart in 1959.  The song appeared on his 1959 album, Lonely Street. Archie Bleyer's Orchestra played on the song.

The song was ranked #49 on Billboard magazine's Top Hot 100 songs of 1959.

Other cover versions
Kitty Wells released it as the title song on her Lonely Street album in 1958.
Patsy Cline recorded the song on her 1962 album, Sentimentally Yours.
Johnny Tillotson recorded the song on his 1962 album, It Keeps Right on A-Hurtin’.
The Everly Brothers recorded the song on their 1963 album, The Everly Brothers Sing Great Country Hits.
Ray Price recorded the song for his 1963 album "Night Life".
Bobby Vinton recorded the song on his 1965 album, Bobby Vinton Sings for Lonely Nights.
Gene Vincent released the song as a single in 1966. 
George Jones recorded the song on his 1967 album, Walk Through This World with Me.
Tammy Wynette recorded the song on her 1968 album, D-I-V-O-R-C-E.
Bing Crosby recorded his interpretation of the song in 1968 for his album, Hey Jude/Hey Bing!
Tony Booth released his version as a single in 1974. It got to number 84 on Billboard's Hot Country Singles chart.
Rex Allen, Jr. on his 1977 album, The Best of Rex. His record got to number 8 on Billboard's Hot Country Singles chart.

Melba Montgomery recorded a version for her 1982 album I Still Care.
Emmylou Harris included a recording of the song on her 1989 Bluebird album.

References

1958 songs
1959 singles
Songs written by Carl Belew
Songs written by W.S. Stevenson
Andy Williams songs
Carl Perkins songs
Kitty Wells songs
Patsy Cline songs
The Everly Brothers songs
Bobby Vinton songs
Gene Vincent songs
Rex Allen Jr. songs
Emmylou Harris songs
Bing Crosby songs
Cadence Records singles